State Highway 288 (SH 288)  is a north–south highway in the southeastern portion of the U.S. state of Texas, between I-45 in downtown Houston and Freeport, where it terminates on FM 1495. The route was originally designated by 1939, replacing the southern portion of SH 19.

Route description

In Harris County, SH 288 is the South Freeway, a divided freeway known for having one of the widest medians of the local road system. It begins as freeway status from its northern terminus at Interstate 69/U.S. Route 59 just south of downtown southward through south Houston. It reaches an intersection with I-610 and continues south through newer subdivisions. It reaches an intersection with State Highway 6, after which it loses its freeway status. From the Harris-Brazoria County Line to Freeport, it is referred to as the Nolan Ryan Expressway, in recognition of Baseball Hall of Fame pitcher Nolan Ryan who grew up in Alvin, Texas, which is not directly on this road. Brazoria County will be calling the tolled portion of the highway, located within the county, the Brazoria County Expressway. North of Angleton, the route returns to freeway status passing west of Angleton, near the Texas Gulf Coast Regional Airport, and around the southwestern side of Lake Jackson. It then turns southward toward Freeport. In Freeport, it is known as Brazosport Boulevard. It reaches its southern terminus at State Highway 36 on the southwest side of town.

Toll lanes

To help alleviate congestion on SH 288, TxDOT (originally HCTRA) and BCTRA constructed toll lanes (also known as the Brazoria County Expressway) in the median of the existing freeway. A nine-mile southern extension to the proposed Grand Parkway (SH 99) is planned. The entire length of the SH 288 toll lanes will have two lanes in each direction. BCTRA will construct the portion located in Brazoria County in two phases. Phase 1 will be from the Harris/Brazoria County line, southward to just south of County Road 58 (Croix Road) for a total of  while phase 2, to be built by TxDot's Toll Operations Division, will continue southward to the Grand Parkway (TX 99) for the remaining . Design work for the entire project began in the summer of 2015. Construction on the toll lanes in Harris County began in November 2016 and construction of phase 1 in Brazoria County begun in June 2017. The SH 288 toll lanes opened on November 16, 2020 and were free to use until November 30. All tolls on the facility will be collected electronically and an EZ Tag, TxTag, or TollTag is required for passage.

History
State Highway 288 was designated on September 26, 1939 as the renumbering of the portion of State Highway 19 south of downtown Houston. On August 1, 1962, SH 288 was extended to FM 1495. On June 25, 1981, SH 288 was rerouted from I-45 to MacGregor Way in Houston on the new freeway. The original routing ran southward along Almeda Road in Houston.  The route traveled southward through Fresno, past the Houston Southwest Airport, before reaching Bonney.  This entire portion of the route from US 90A southward was transferred to Farm to Market Road 521 and Spur 300 on December 14, 1981, as SH 288 was rerouted onto the new freeway from US 90A to Spur 300.  The route then traveled east through downtown Angleton, continuing southeast before reaching Freeport.  This original section is now part of County Road 543 and Farm to Market Road 523.  SH 288 was redirected southward from Angleton when the city of Clute became more populated, then continued southward to a new intersection with State Highway 36 west of Freeport. On November 18, 1983, SH 288 was rerouted on the new freeway from MacGregor Way to US 90A. The entire remaining section from FM 521 north of Angleton to Clute was transferred first to Texas State Highway 227 on September 26, 1986, and later Business Highway 288 on October 25, 1990 when the bypass around the western side of Lake Jackson opened. The section from Clute south to Freeport was transferred to SH 227, and the section concurrent with SH 36 became SH 36 on February 23, 1989. On August 15, 1989, SH 288 was extended south over part of SH 227 and concurrent with SH 36, restoring the lost section from Clute to Freeport.

Major intersections

Business route

SH 288 has one business route.

Business State Highway 288-B (Bus. SH 288) is a bypass of SH 288 through Angleton, Richwood and Clute. The route was created in 1987 as SH 227, which was redesignated as Business SH 288-B on October 25, 1990.

Major junctions

Notes

References

External links
 TxDOT - Toll Operations Division

288
Transportation in Brazoria County, Texas
Transportation in Harris County, Texas
Transportation in Houston